Dimitrios Karydis (born 20 January 1951) is a Greek former swimmer. He competed in the men's 100 metre butterfly at the 1972 Summer Olympics.

References

1951 births
Living people
Greek male swimmers
Olympic swimmers of Greece
Swimmers at the 1972 Summer Olympics
Place of birth missing (living people)
Male butterfly swimmers